The Maui Invitational, currently known as the Maui Jim Maui Invitational, is an annual early-season college basketball tournament that takes place Thanksgiving week, normally in Lahaina, Hawaii, at the Lahaina Civic Center on the island of Maui. It is hosted by Chaminade University of Honolulu, an NCAA Division II school. Eight NCAA Division I men's basketball teams are invited to Maui to complete the field. The Maui Invitational has been played since 1984 and is carried by ESPN. Camping World became the title sponsor for the 2020 Tournament only. Maui Jim became the title sponsor of the tournament in 2015 and returned as title sponsor in 2021; the previous fourteen tournaments were sponsored by EA Sports.

History
The tournament had its roots in a game that is considered one of the greatest upsets in college history. On December 23, 1982 the top-ranked and undefeated University of Virginia made a scheduled trip to Honolulu for a game. Originally seeking to play the University of Hawaii, Virginia agreed to play Chaminade, which at the time belonged to the NAIA, on the trip instead. In a game that was not televised and only covered by one sportswriter from outside the local media (Michael Wilbon of The Washington Post, who was in Honolulu to cover the University of Maryland's performance in the inaugural Aloha Bowl), Chaminade defeated the Ralph Sampson-led Virginia squad 77–72 in front of 3,300 spectators at the Neal S. Blaisdell Center.  Shortly after the upset, Virginia head coach Terry Holland congratulated Chaminade's athletic director, Mike Vasconcellos, and suggested to him that he consider beginning a Hawaii tournament. Two years later, the Maui Classic was inaugurated with Chaminade reaching the final and losing to Providence.

Today the tournament provides schools an opportunity to compete on a neutral court with some of the top basketball programs in the country. Associated Press college basketball editor Jim O'Connell called the Maui Invitational "the best in-season tournament in the country – the standard by which all others are compared."  Some 108 schools representing 26 conferences and 40 states have competed in the Invitational.  Five times the winner has gone on to win the NCAA Men's Division I Basketball Championship later that season: Michigan in 1988, North Carolina three times—in 2004, 2008, and 2016, and UConn in 2010.

Of the eight teams which play in the tournament, generally there is one from each of the six major conferences (the Pac-12, Big Ten, Big 12, Big East (before its 2013 split), ACC, and the SEC), one from another conference such as the American Athletic Conference, Conference USA, the Mountain West Conference or the Atlantic 10, and Chaminade. Beginning with the 2011 tournament, the field includes four additional mainland teams that play the Maui-bound teams at home. The four mainland teams will then play each other in regional games.  The winner from each game will square off in the championship contest, preceded by the consolation game between the losers.

Beginning in 2018 and continuing with every even-numbered year, Chaminade will play games on the mainland, and eight Division I schools will compete in the championship bracket on Maui. In odd-numbered years, Chaminade will compete in the championship bracket.

Due to COVID-19 issues, the 2020 and 2021 tournaments were both moved to the US mainland. The 2020 event was held at Harrah's Cherokee Center in Asheville, North Carolina, while the 2021 event was  held at Michelob Ultra Arena on the Las Vegas Strip.

Effect on local economy
Each year more than 4,000 out-of-state visitors—boosters, players, officials, team and game personnel, media representatives, sponsors, production crews and basketball fans—attend. The 2007 Maui Invitational Tournament ranked among Hawaii's top revenue-generating events, bolstering the local economy by more than $8 million according to financial data released by the Maui Visitors Bureau. The tournament has brought more than $110 million to Maui's economy since the tournament's debut in 1984 (through 2005).

Yearly champions, runners-up, and MVPs

 * Indicates game won in overtime

Appearances & Championships by team
Source:

Future tournament fields

2023
On April 1, 2022, the participants for the 2023 tournament were announced:
Chaminade
Gonzaga
Kansas
Marquette
Purdue
Syracuse
Tennessee
UCLA

2024

Auburn
Colorado
Dayton
Iowa State
Memphis
Michigan State
North Carolina
UConn

References

External links
 

College men's basketball competitions in the United States
College basketball competitions
 
Lahaina, Hawaii
Recurring sporting events established in 1984
1984 establishments in Hawaii